Chondracanthus elegans is a red algae species in the genus Chondracanthus.  The name  is Latin for 'elegant.'

References

External links

Gigartinaceae
Species described in 1993